Tianjing (京), romanized at the time as Tienking, was the name given to Nanjing when it served as the capital of Hong Xiuquan's Heavenly Kingdom from 1853 to 1864, amid the Qing Empire's Taiping Rebellion.

History 
Nanjing, was taken by the Taiping rebels on March 19, 1853.

The Taiping government had set up an egalitarian organization, with a strict separation between men and women; in such major towns as Wuchang and Nanjing (a.k.a. Tianjing), this rule was strictly enforced : men were living in their own quarters, and women and children were in others.

Men and women were regrouped in these quarters by groups of 25 (called guan), depending on their trades. There were guans regrouping bricklayers, carpenters, tailors, and even sauce cooks. There also were "public services" guans for such trades as physicians, firemen, or undertakers.

Small shops selling meat, fish, or tea, were kept separate depending on their customers: there was one shop for male customers, another shop for female customers, and the Taiping police was making sure this was indeed enforced. In Tianjing, people reacted in different ways: while a number of people did accept the new way, others went into hiding, or fled, leading to a shortage of doctors, as many fled the town.

Tianjing finally fell to the imperial Qing army (the Xiang Army) on July 19, 1864, leading to bloody street fighting, during which some 156,000 rebels were killed.

References

Notes

Citations

Bibliography

 .

History of Nanjing
Taiping Heavenly Kingdom